David Vitalyevich Volk (born 11 April 2001) is a Russian football player. He plays for FC Dynamo Makhachkala.

Club career
He made his debut in the Russian Football National League for FC Baltika Kaliningrad on 7 November 2020 in a game against FC Alania Vladikavkaz.

References

External links
 Profile by Russian Football National League
 

2001 births
Footballers from Kazan
Living people
Russian footballers
Russia youth international footballers
Association football goalkeepers
FC Rubin Kazan players
FC Baltika Kaliningrad players
FC Dynamo Makhachkala players
Russian First League players
Russian Second League players